Arthur John Broback (February 2, 1931 – April 10, 2019) was an American politician who served in the Washington House of Representatives from 1983 to 1985 and from 1991 to 1993.

He died on April 10, 2019, in Gig Harbor, Washington at age 88.

References

1931 births
2019 deaths
Republican Party members of the Washington House of Representatives